The following lists events that happened during 1958 in Colony of Singapore.

Incumbents
 Governor: Sir William Allmond Codrington Goode
 Chief Minister: Lim Yew Hock
 Chief Secretary: Edgeworth Beresford David (starting 29 January 1958)

Events

March
 30 March – Nanyang University, a private university using the Chinese language (Singaporean Mandarin) is officially opened. It eventually merged with the University of Singapore to form the National University of Singapore.

April
 3 April – Times House is officially opened, serving as the operation headquarters of Singapore's newspapers.

May
 13 May – The third Merdeka Talks took place, which concluded with the same agreement from 1957.

July
 1 July – The Legal Aid Bureau is created to assist the need with legal matters.

August
 1 August – The State of Singapore Act 1958 passed, granting Singapore self-rule.
 8 August – The Master Plan, which was intended to guide Singapore's development over a two-decade period, is approved by the Singapore government and comes into force.
 9 August – The first air-conditioned supermarket, Fitzpatrick's Supermarket is officially opened. Since then, the area has been taken over by The Paragon.

November
 22 November – The Shaw House, a 10-storey office block, is officially opened by then Chief Minister Lim Yew Hock.
 24 November – The Syariah Court is established to tighten divorce processes and safeguard marriages.

Births
 13 October – Sam Tan, former politician
 10 December – Ng Eng Hen, Minister for Defence

See also
List of years in Singapore

References

 
Singapore
Years in Singapore